State Route 251 (SR 251) is a  route that serves as a connection for U.S. Route 31 (US 31) in Athens with SR 53 in  Ardmore.

Route description

The southern terminus of SR 251 is located at an intersection with US 31 opposite Pryor Street in Athens.  After crossing I-65 via overpass and exiting the Athens city limits, the route proceeds primarily northeasterly through several unincorporated communities before entering the city limits of Ardmore.  The northern terminus is located at an intersection with SR 53 running concurrently with 6th Street.  At its northern terminus, SR 251 reverts to Ardmore Avenue, which picks up SR 53.

History

SR 251's entire route was formerly designated as part of US 31 between 1925 and 1956 before it was rerouted onto the corridor of present-day I-65, which it has overlapped on that particular stretch since 1966.

Major intersections

References

External links

251
Transportation in Limestone County, Alabama
U.S. Route 31